Doreen Dredge (born 14 July 1931) is a Canadian athlete. She competed in the women's high jump at the 1948 Summer Olympics.

References

External links
 

1931 births
Living people
Athletes (track and field) at the 1948 Summer Olympics
Canadian female high jumpers
Olympic track and field athletes of Canada
Sportspeople from Saskatchewan
People from Kelvington, Saskatchewan